The 2006 Coastal Carolina Chanticleers football team represented Coastal Carolina University in the 2006 NCAA Division I FCS football season. The Chanticleers were led by fourth-year head coach David Bennett and played their home games at Brooks Stadium. Coastal Carolina competed as a member of the Big South Conference. They finished the season 9–3 with a 4–0 record in conference play, winning their second outright Big South championship and their first berth in the FCS playoffs.

Schedule

References

Coastal Carolina
Coastal Carolina Chanticleers football seasons
Big South Conference football champion seasons
Coastal Carolina Chanticleers football